Governorate Council elections in the Nineveh Governorate of Iraq were held on January 30, 2005, simultaneously with the national legislative election.

Results 
The province is largely a mix of Sunnis and Kurds, but there is also a significant Shi'ite presence. Despite making the vast majority, almost all Sunni Arabs boycotted the election, leading to the Kurdish party winning almost all of the seats.

The council voted for the independent Sunni Arab, Duraid Mohammed Kashmula, to continue as governor. His brother, Usama Yousif Kashmula, had been appointed as governor of Nineveh Governorate in 2003 by the Coalition Provisional Authority, and Duraid succeeded Usama after he was assassinated in July 2004.

References

Nineveh Governorate
2005 elections in Iraq
Governorate elections in Iraq